Francesco di Paola Villadecani  (22 February 1780 – 13 June 1861) was a cardinal of the Catholic Church who was Archbishop of Messina from 1823 to 1861.

He was born on 22 February 1780 in Messina, Sicily, Italy. In 1820 he was named titular bishop of Orthosias in Caria. On 25 April 1823 he was elected Archbishop of Messina and his appointment was confirmed on 17 November.

Pope Gregory XVI elevated him to the rank of cardinal in the consistory of 27 January 1843, assigning him as Cardinal Priest to Santi Bonifacio ed Alessio. In 1857 he was appointed apostolic administrator sede plena in the person of Theatine Giuseppe Maria Papardo the pack, Titular Bishop of Sinope.

He died in Messina on 13 June 1861 at the age of 81 and was buried in the Cathedral of Messina, where his tomb can still be seen.

References

19th-century Italian cardinals
1780 births
1861 deaths
Archbishops of Messina
Cardinals created by Pope Gregory XVI
18th-century Italian Roman Catholic archbishops